X is the second studio album by American rapper Ken Carson, released through Opium and Interscope Records on July 8, 2022. In the United States, the album entered at number 115 on the Billboard 200. The deluxe version, titled Xtended, was released on October 31, 2022.

Critical reception

X was released to mixed reviews, with critics feeling that the album lacked originality and sounded like a poor imitation of Opium label boss, fellow rapper, and the album's executive producer Playboi Carti's album Whole Lotta Red. Anthony Malone of HipHopDX stated that Carson lacked identity and creativity, saying, "Lacking variety from the beats and any real force from the artist himself, X is a repetitive listening experience. There are moments of fun: the short and succulent 'Money Hunt'; the energetic flexing in 'Get Rich or Die'; and Destroy Lonely's verse on 'MDMA'. But it's not enough to justify the 20-track output." Pitchfork reviewer Alphonse Pierre said that "Carson lacks the curiosity, imagination, and irreverence to do anything more than lay down the same glazed Auto-Tune raps, with only rare attempts to liven them up", and that "X is such a slog that the smallest signs of taste are cause for celebration. The pitch change at the end of 'Get Rich or Die' is something! When he's listing off his drugs on 'PDBMH', the Auto-Tune is turned up and in that instant the sped-up flow is slightly (emphasis on 'slightly') reminiscent of [Young] Thug!" but that overall the album was "forgettable". YouTube music critic Anthony Fantano gave the album a rare 0 out of 10, panning its songwriting and production and concluding that "Ken Carson's new album is devoid of redeeming qualities".

Track listing

Charts

References

2022 albums

Interscope Records albums